Steal This Movie! is a 2000 American biographical film directed by Robert Greenwald and written by Bruce Graham, based on the 1976 book To America with Love: Letters From the Underground by Anita and Abbie Hoffman and 1992 book Abbie Hoffman: American Rebel by Marty Jezer. The film follows 1960s radical figure Abbie Hoffman, and stars Vincent D'Onofrio and Janeane Garofalo, with Jeanne Tripplehorn and Kevin Pollak.

The film follows Hoffman's (D'Onofrio) relationship with his second wife Anita (Garofalo) and their "awakening" and subsequent conversion to an activist life. The title of the film is a play on Hoffman's 1971 counter-culture guidebook titled Steal This Book.

Steal This Movie! premiered at the 2000 Santa Barbara Film Festival, and also showed at the South by Southwest Film Festival.

Cast

Reception
On review aggregator website Rotten Tomatoes, the film holds an approval rating of 51% based on 43 reviews, and an average rating of 4.7/10. The site's critical consensus reads, "D'Onofrio's performance fails to do justice to Hoffman, and the depiction of the 60s also rings false." On Metacritic, the film has a weighted average score of 36 out of 100, based on 26 critics, indicating "generally unfavorable reviews".

Some criticism of the film is that it is hagiographic of Abbie Hoffman and fails to give proper credit to other activists of the era like Paul Krassner, who co-founded the Yippies with Hoffman and his wife.  Other critics disliked the film's editing, which frequently relied upon the use of documentary footage, voiceovers, and subtitles to help advance the plot.  However, nearly all film reviewers agreed that the strong acting performance of Vincent D'Onofrio as Hoffman overcame the film's otherwise minor flaws and modest budget.

In September 2000, america Hoffman, son of Abbie and Anita, filed suit against Lions Gate Films in an attempt to block further distribution of the film, accusing the film-makers of invasion of privacy and presenting an "unauthorized, false and uncomplimentary portrayal" of him as a child. In the suit, america protested his portrayal in the film as "a wimpy, quiet, sulking and effeminate 'mama's boy,'" and accused film-makers of implying america "may be a homosexual." Hoffman later dropped the suit and retracted his claims against the film-makers, stating "I understand that the filmmaker's characterization of me and my relationship to my father was made in good faith and with honorable intentions."

See also
 Conspiracy: The Trial of the Chicago 8 
 Chicago 10 
 William Kunstler: Disturbing the Universe 
 The Chicago 8 
 The Trial of the Chicago 7

References

External links
  
  
 

2000 films
American biographical films
Films based on biographies
Films shot in Toronto
Films directed by Robert Greenwald
Films about activists
Films about the Chicago Seven
Cultural depictions of Abbie Hoffman
2000s English-language films
2000s American films